Jamie Glenn Kiel is an American politician from the state of Alabama. He currently serves as a member of the Alabama House of Representatives for District 18. He is a member of the Republican Party.

Education 
Kiel graduated from Northwest Shoals Community College with an Associate's degree in business in 1995. After graduating, Kiel enrolled in the University of North Alabama where he earned a B.S. in Business, Management, Marketing, and Related Support Services.

Career 
In 1996, while Kiel was enrolled in the University of North Alabama, he started his equipment rental company, Kiel Equipment. Kiel still runs the company today. In 2013, Kiel became a managing partner with SAL Properties, a property management company. During his time as owner of Kiel Equipment, Kiel also became a founding member of the Franklin County Broadband Taskforce and a member of the Federal Monitoring Committee for the Franklin County School System. Kiel announced his run for State House in 2017, after Representative Johnny Mack Morrow announced that he would not be running for reelection. Kiel defeated his Republican Primary opponent, Tony Riley, winning 79.9% of the vote. Kiel then defeated his Democratic opponent, Eddie Britton, by a margin of over 40 points.

Committee positions 
Kiel is a member of the Insurance, State Government, and Ways and Means Education committees.

Elections

Alabama House of Representatives District 18

2018 Republican Primary

2018 General Election

References 

Republican Party members of the Alabama House of Representatives
University of North Alabama alumni
Living people
21st-century American politicians
1974 births